Freginat is a traditional dish typically attributed to the region around the city of Lleida in Catalonia. Freginat typically consists of fried pieces or slivers of pork, combined with a variety of ingredients, spices, and side dishes. Often served during the periodic slaughter of pig stock in the rural regions of the Pyrenees mountain range, the dish has become a staple in Catalan pork cuisine.

Etymology

A Catalan word, freginat could be a derivative of the Catalan verb "de fregir", meaning "to fry".

Ingredients

Freginat may varies greatly from place, location, and recipe, but all Freginat varieties include sliced or cut pork. A typical dish might include pieces of bacon, black or white beans, or rice.

See also

 Fricassee
 Catalan cuisine

References

French cuisine